Caro Gorbaciov (internationally released as Dear Gorbachev) is a 1988 Italian drama film directed by Carlo Lizzani. 
It entered the main competition at the 45th Venice International Film Festival, in which it won the President of the Italian Senate's Gold Medal.

Cast 
Harvey Keitel: Nikolai Bukharin
Flaminia Lizzani: Anna Michailovna Larina Bucharina
Gianluca Favilla: Yuri Larin

References

External links

1988 films
Films directed by Carlo Lizzani
Films scored by Luis Bacalov
1980s Italian-language films
English-language Italian films
1980s English-language films
1988 multilingual films
Italian multilingual films
1980s Italian films